Malaysia sent a delegation to compete at the 2008 Summer Paralympics in Beijing.

Medallists

Sports

Archery

|-
|align=left|Muhamad Salam Sidik
|rowspan=2 align=left|Men's individual recurve W1/W2
|620
|8
|W 97-90
|L 94-106
|colspan=4|did not advance
|-
|align=left|Zulkifli Mat Zin
|610
|12
|W 96-83
|L 103-108
|colspan=4|did not advance
|}

Athletics

Men's track

Powerlifting

Men

Women

Sailing

Malaysians competed in the following event in sailing:
 Two-Person Keelboat - SKUD18

Swimming

Men

See also
2008 Summer Paralympics
Malaysia at the Paralympics
Malaysia at the 2008 Summer Olympics

External links
Beijing 2008 Paralympic Games Official Site
International Paralympic Committee

References

Nations at the 2008 Summer Paralympics
2008
Paralympics